This is a list of lists of radio stations in Ghana, organized by region.

Western Region
Eastern Region
Central Region
Northern Region
Greater Accra Region 
Brong Ahafo Region 
Upper East Region 
Upper West Region
Volta Region 
Ashanti Region

See also
Media of Ghana
 List of newspapers in Ghana
Telecommunications in Ghana
New Media in Ghana